The First National Bank Building is a historic 8-story office building in Lincoln, Nebraska. It was built by Selden-Breck Co. in 1911 for the First National Bank, founded by Civil War veteran Amasa Cobb in 1871. It was designed in the Commercial style by Hyland & Green, an architectural firm based in Chicago. It has been listed on the National Register of Historic Places since March 5, 1998.

References

National Register of Historic Places in Lincoln, Nebraska
Buildings designated early commercial in the National Register of Historic Places in Nebraska
Office buildings completed in 1911
Office buildings in Nebraska
1911 establishments in Nebraska